Black Legion is a 1937 American crime drama film, directed by Archie Mayo, with a script by Abem Finkel and William Wister Haines based on an original story by producer Robert Lord.  The film stars Humphrey Bogart, Dick Foran, Erin O'Brien-Moore and Ann Sheridan. It is a fictionalized treatment of the historic Black Legion of the 1930s in Michigan, a white vigilante group. A third of its members lived in Detroit, which had also been a center of the Ku Klux Klan in the 1920s.

The plot is based on the May 1935 kidnapping and murder in Detroit of Charles A. Poole, a Works Progress Administration organizer. Twelve men were tried and 11 convicted of his murder; all were sentenced to life. Authorities prosecuted another 37 men for related crimes; they were also convicted and sentenced to prison, breaking up the Legion. Columbia Pictures had made Legion of Terror (1936) based on the same case.

Black Legion was praised by critics for its dramatization of a dark social phenomenon. It was one of several films of this period in opposition to fascist and racist organizations. Having followed Bogart's breakthrough in The Petrified Forest (1936), a number of reviewers commented that Bogart's performance should lead to his becoming a major star. Warner Bros. did not give the film any special treatment, however, promoting it and Bogart in their standard fashion. Stardom did come with High Sierra in 1941.

Plot
Frank Taylor works in a Midwestern factory and expects to receive a job promotion that has become available. When he is passed over in favor of hard-working Polish immigrant Joe Dombrowski, Taylor joins the Black Legion, a secret organization that drives away immigrants and racial minorities through violent means. Dressed in black robes, Taylor and the Black Legion go on a torchlight raid, driving Dombrowski and his family from their home. 

With Dombrowski gone, Taylor receives the promotion, but when the Black Legion leadership forces him to spend time recruiting new members, Taylor is demoted in favor of his Irish neighbor, Mike Grogan. That night, the Black Legion attacks Grogan.

Taylor's co-worker and friend, Ed Jackson, who is married to Grogan's daughter, suspects Taylor is connected to the attacks on immigrants. Jackson mentions his concerns to Taylor's wife, Ruth, who confronts Taylor. When he responds to her with violence, Ruth leaves him. As his Black Legion activities and drinking increases, Taylor loses his job and begins a relationship with Pearl Davis, a woman of ill repute.

Seeing his friend's life unraveling, Jackson goes to see Taylor to express concern. A drunken Taylor tells Jackson about his secret life with the violent Black Legion. Afraid that his slip-of-the-tongue might prompt Jackson to go to the police, Taylor tells the Black Legion leadership what happened. The leadership orders Taylor to capture and execute Jackson.

Unlike the Black Legion's other victims, Jackson is unafraid and threatens to go to the police. When Jackson tries to escape, Taylor panics and shoots him. Taylor is arrested for Jackson's murder. Ruth returns for Taylor's trial to support him. The lawyer for the Black Legion threatens Taylor's wife and son to stop him from implicating the hate organization, but filled with self-loathing, Taylor tells the truth in court. All of the members of the Black Legion are sentenced to life in prison for Jackson's murder.

Cast

Humphrey Bogart as Frank Taylor
Dick Foran as Ed Jackson
Erin O'Brien-Moore as Ruth Taylor
Ann Sheridan as Betty Grogan
Helen Flint as Pearl Danvers
Joseph Sawyer as Cliff Moore 
Clifford Soubier as Mike Grogan
Alonzo Price as Alf Hargrave
Paul Harvey as Billings
Dickie Jones as Buddy Taylor
Samuel Hinds as Judge
Addison Richards as Prosecuting Attorney

Eddie Acuff as Metcalf
Dorothy Vaughan as Mrs. Grogan
John Litel as Tommy Smith
Henry Brandon as Joe Dombrowski
Charles Halton as Osgood
Pat C. Flick as Nick Strumpas
Francis Sayles as Charlie
Paul Stanton as Barham
Harry Hayden as Jones
Egon Brecher as Old Man Dombrowski (credited as Dombrowski, Sr.)
Robert Homans as Motorcycle Cop (uncredited)
Jack Mower as Court Clerk (uncredited)

Production
Black Legion went into production in late August 1936. Many of the details about the Legion portrayed in the film, such as the initiation oath and the confessions in the trial scenes, were based on known facts about the historic organization. Because United States libel laws had recently been broadened in scope by court rulings, Warner Bros. underplayed some aspects of the group's political activities to avoid legal repercussion. The Ku Klux Klan sued Warner Bros. for patent infringement for the film's use of a patented Klan insignia: a white cross on a red background with a black square. A judge threw out the case.

Location shooting took place in private homes in the Hollywood area, the Providencia Ranch in the Hollywood Hills and the Warner Ranch in Calabasas.  Executive producer Hal B. Wallis had wanted Edward G. Robinson to play the lead role, but producer Robert Lord thought Robinson was too foreign looking, and wanted a "distinctly American looking actor to play [the] part."

Reception
Writing for Night and Day in 1937, Graham Greene gave the film a good review, characterizing it as "an intelligent and exciting, if rather earnest film". Greene praises Bogart's acting and comments that the film's intelligence comes from the director's attention to the moments of horror. Frank S. Nugent of The New York Times praised the film's direction, writing, performances, and strong themes; calling it "editorial cinema at its best". Dennis Schwartz from Ozus' World Movie Reviews awarded the film a grade B−, calling it "A gripping social drama based on the newspaper headlines of the day". TV Guide gave the film 3 out of 5 stars, calling it "A grim, often brutal film", while criticizing Bogart's performance as being unsympathetic and Sheridan's role as "thankless".

Awards and honors
Robert Lord's original screenplay received an Academy Award nomination in 1937, but lost to William Wellman and Robert Carson's work for A Star Is Born.  The National Board of Review named Black Legion as the best film of 1937, and Humprey Bogart as the best actor for his work in the film. It was one of a series of anti-fascist films in this period that addressed the dangers to society from groups that opposed immigrants (especially Catholics and Jews), Asians, and blacks, showing that fascism and racism resulted in similar "crimes against humanity."

Notes

External links

 
 
 
 

1937 crime drama films
1937 films
American black-and-white films
Films directed by Archie Mayo
Films about the Ku Klux Klan
Melodrama films
Warner Bros. films
Race in the United States
American crime drama films
Films produced by Robert Lord (screenwriter)
1930s English-language films
1930s American films
Films scored by Bernhard Kaun
Films set in the Midwestern United States